Kim Jung-ah (Korean: 김정아; born on August 2, 1983), known professionally as  Jung Ah or Jung A, is a South Korean singer. She was a member of Kiss Five and the former leader of After School. In 2016, Pledis Entertainment announced that her contract had expired and she had graduated from After School naturally.

Career
Kim joined with After School's unofficial first appearance on December 29, 2008 at the SBS Song Festival, performing "Play Girlz" with Son Dam-bi and Kahi. In the beginning on 2009, After School released debut single album New Schoolgirl, with the lead single "AH!" on January 15. After School made their debut stage on MBC's the 17th January episode of Music Core.

Jung Ah became the new leader of the group after Kahi's graduation.

In September 2012, it was announced that Jung Ah had been cast into MBC Every1's drama Reckless Family 2.

On April 7, 2015, Pledis Entertainment announced that Jung Ah and labelmate Han Dong Geun would be releasing a duet entitled "Between the Two of Us" on April 16.

On January 28, 2016, Jung Ah's contract with Pledis Entertainment expired and she graduated from After School after seven years of activity.

On May 25, 2016, Jung Ah announced she'd debut as a solo artist with a new album in June, featuring rapper J-STAR.

Personal life
On March 25, 2013, reports surfaced stating that Jungah and SHINee's Onew had been dating for over a year after images were released showing them together. In the past, Onew had stated that Jungah was his "ideal girl". Representatives for both Jungah and Onew denied the dating allegations and stated that they are just "close friends". However, netizens were not convinced after unveiling Twitter conversations between Jungah and Onew where they had mentioned "buying dinner" and Jungah had mentioned that she had "fallen in love". The tweets were deleted following the reports.

In mid 2015, reports arose stating that Jungah and basketball player Jung Chang Young were dating. Her agency initially denied the reports, however they later confirmed that they were in fact dating. On August 24, 2017, a source from her agency stated, “Jung Ah and Jung Chang Young will be holding a wedding ceremony next year. Jung Chang Young's warm heart influenced her decision to marry him.” Jung Chang Young is five years younger than Jung Ah, and they have reportedly been dating for about a year. The pair married on April 28, 2018. On October 23, 2019, she announced on social media that their first son was born. In October 2021, Kim gave birth to a second daughter.

Discography

Singles

Soundtrack singles

Other songs

Filmography

TV drama

Music video

Variety show

References

External links
 

Living people
People from Incheon
Musicians from Incheon
South Korean female idols
South Korean women pop singers
Pledis Entertainment artists
After School (band) members
21st-century South Korean singers
1983 births
21st-century South Korean women singers